Chiara Saporetti (born 18 August 1969) is a former Italian female mountain runner who won a medal at individual senior level  at the World Mountain Running Championships.

See also
 Italy at the World Mountain Running Championships

References

External links
 Chiara Saporetti at Athlinks

1969 births
Living people
Italian female mountain runners